Sébastien Lareau and Daniel Nestor were the defending champions, but did not compete this year.

Paul Haarhuis and Sjeng Schalken won the title by defeating Petr Pála and Pavel Vízner 6–2, 3–6, 6–4 in the final.

Seeds

Draw

Draw

References
 Main Draw (ATP)
 Qualifying Draw (ATP)

Kingfisher Airlines Tennis Open
2000 ATP Tour